Kishanganj Lok Sabha constituency is one of the 40 Lok Sabha (parliamentary) constituencies in Bihar state in India

Assembly segments
Presently, Kishanganj Lok Sabha constituency comprises the following six Vidhan Sabha (legislative assembly) segments:

Members of Parliament
Following is the list of the Members of Parliament from Kishanganj constituency

Election results

2019 general elections

2014 general elections

See also
 Kishanganj district
 List of Constituencies of the Lok Sabha

References

External links
Kishanganj lok sabha  constituency election 2019 date and schedule

Lok Sabha constituencies in Bihar
Politics of Kishanganj district
Politics of Purnia district